Scythris aulaeella is a moth of the family Scythrididae. It was described by Bengt Å. Bengtsson in 2014. It is found in Limpopo, South Africa.

References

Endemic moths of South Africa
aulaeella
Moths described in 2014